Prunus andersonii is a species of shrub in the rose family, part of the same genus as the peach, cherry, and almond. Its common names include desert peach and desert almond. It is native to eastern California and western Nevada, where it grows in forests and scrub in desert and mountains.  It was named after Charles Lewis Anderson by Asa Gray.

Prunus andersonii is a shrub approaching 2 meters (80 inches) in height, its tangling branches narrowing to spiny-tipped twigs. The shrub is deciduous. The inflorescence is a solitary flower or pair of flowers. Flowers bloom before or at the same time as the leaves appear. The fruits are fleshy in years with ample moisture, and dry in drought years. The seed is a heart-shaped stone. The plant reproduces sexually via germination of the seed, and vegetatively by sprouting from its rhizome. One plant may sprout and resprout from its rhizomes to form a very large clone which can spread over several acres.

Many rodents collect and eat the fruits and cache the seeds. Among Native American groups, the Paiute used this plant for making tea and medicinal remedies, and the Cahuilla considered the fruit a delicacy.

References

External links
 
 Jepson Flora Project: Prunus andersonii
 Calphotos Photo gallery, University of California
 

andersonii
Flora of Nevada
Plants described in 1868
Flora of California